The Integrated Civilian Home Defense Forces, also called the Civilian Home Defense Force and commonly referred to by its acronym CHDF, was an irregular paramilitary force supervised and deployed by the heads of the local government in the Philippines — provincial governors, city and municipal mayors. The CHDF was active during the 1970s, and was officially disbanded in 1986 after the People Power Revolution. However, the creation of the Citizen Armed Force Geographical Unit in 1987 provided the opportunity for CHDF members to once again perform their former duties.

Creation
The Philippine Constabulary recruited, organized and equipped official civilian militia during the Hukbalahap Rebellion after World War II. After the Hukbalahap were effectively suppressed in 1956, these militia units were organized into "Barrio Self-Defense Units".

In 1972, Ferdinand E. Marcos declared martial law in the Philippines. One of the terms of the 1973 martial law-era Philippine Constitution was the establishment of the "Self-Defense Forces" to help combat the Islamic insurgency in Mindanao and later the Communist insurgency.

In 1977, Marcos issued Presidential Decree No. 1016, formally establishing the Integrated Civilian Home Defense Forces for the purpose of maintenance of peace and order. At its inception, the CHDF numbered 73,000 men, and became a notorious human rights violator.

In July 1987, Corazon Aquino issued Executive Order 275, dissolving the CHDF and other paramilitary units. However, that same month she issued Executive Order 264, establishing the Citizen Armed Force Geographical Unit on the advice of then-Defense Secretary Fidel V. Ramos. Former members, between 25%-70%, of the disbanded CHDF were then integrated into the CAFGU.

Organization
Over-all organization, training and equipment was provided by the Department of National Defense, while screening and appointment of actual members was carried out by the military provincial commander upon the recommendation of the local government heads and the Chief of the Philippine Constabulary. Deployment and utilization of the CHDF troops fell under the supervision of the provincial governor, city and municipal mayors, who coordinated with military and Integrated National Police units in areas under the jurisdiction of the local government. In practice, the CHDF were under the control of the city and municipal mayors.

In media 
The antagonists in Lav Diaz' 2018 film Season of the Devil are specifically identified as members of the martial law era Civilian Home Defense Forces, and are responsible for various atrocities in the Barrio of Ginto.

See also
Timeline of the Marcos Dictatorship
Citizen Armed Force Geographical Unit
Season of the Devil

References

Department of National Defense (Philippines)
Military of the Philippines
Reserve and Auxiliary Units of the Philippine Military
Establishments by Philippine presidential decree